Nkosinathi Sibisi (born 22 September 1995) is a South African soccer player who plays as a defender for South African Premier Division side Orlando Pirates.

International career
He made his debut for South Africa national soccer team on 10 June 2021 in a friendly against Uganda.

References

Living people
1995 births
Sportspeople from Durban
South African soccer players
Association football defenders
Lamontville Golden Arrows F.C. players
Orlando Pirates F.C. players
South African Premier Division players
South Africa international soccer players